The Irish Medical Journal is a peer-reviewed Irish medical publication founded in 1867.
It is the official publication of the Irish Medical Organisation and is a continuation of the Journal of the Irish Medical Association.

References

Monthly journals
English-language journals
Publications established in 1867
General medical journals
1867 establishments in Ireland